Thomas Preston-Werner (born May 27, 1979) is an American billionaire software developer and entrepreneur. He is an active contributor within the free and open-source software community, most prominently in the San Francisco Bay Area, where he lives.

He is best known as the founder and former CEO of GitHub, a Git repository web-based hosting service, which he co-founded in 2008 with Chris Wanstrath and P. J. Hyett. He resigned from GitHub in 2014 when an internal investigation concluded that he and his wife harassed an employee. Preston-Werner is also the creator of the avatar service Gravatar, the TOML configuration file format, the static site generator software Jekyll, and the Semantic Versioning Specification (SemVer).

Early life
Preston-Werner grew up in Dubuque, Iowa. His father died when he was a child. His mother was a teacher and his stepfather was an engineer.

He graduated high school at Dubuque Senior High School and attended Harvey Mudd College in Claremont, California for 2 years before dropping out to pursue other endeavours. He realized that he enjoyed programming far more than the math that was the core of his physics studies.

Influence
As an active contributor to the open-source developer and hacker culture, most prominently in areas involving the programming language Ruby, he has written articles regarding his philosophies and opinions on various issues.  He has been featured as a guest on podcasts, including Rubyology and SitePoint, and he often speaks out about his conviction that developers should seek to collaborate more, and the measures which would promote such collaboration, such as writing better documentation and contributing to other people's projects.

Preston was one of the initial members of the San Francisco group IcanhazRuby or ICHR, after he became a regular member of the San Francisco Ruby Meetups. He continued until the meetings became overwhelmed by venture capital investors searching for talent; this prompted him to seek more private gatherings. On April 8, 2011, he also started a conference called CodeConf, by means of GitHub's influence in the coding community.

Preston-Werner is the creator of the TOML configuration file format.

Career
In an article published by Hacker Monthly in 2010, Preston wrote about his passion for ensuring that developers document the code they write so others can easily understand how it works.

In 2004, Preston-Werner founded Gravatar, a service for providing globally unique avatars that follow users from site to site. The company grew to about 32,000 users in 2007, when Preston-Werner sold the company to Automattic.
In 2005 he moved to San Francisco to work at Powerset, a natural language search engine. Powerset was acquired by Microsoft. Preston-Werner declined a $300,000 bonus and stock options from Microsoft so that he could focus on GitHub.

GitHub

Preston-Werner co-founded GitHub in 2008 with Chris Wanstrath, P. J. Hyett and Scott Chacon, as a place to share and collaborate on code.

In 2010, Preston-Werner read a comment on Twitter insulting the quality of GitHub's search function. This prompted him to overhaul the service's search, drawing on his experience having worked at Powerset.

Resignation from GitHub
Julie Ann Horvath, a GitHub programmer, alleged in March 2014 that Tom Preston-Werner and his wife Theresa had engaged in a pattern of harassment against her that led her to leave the company. GitHub initially denied Horvath's allegations, then following an internal investigation, confirmed some of the claims. Preston-Werner resigned. GitHub's new CEO Chris Wanstrath said the "investigation found Tom Preston-Werner in his capacity as GitHub's CEO acted inappropriately, including confrontational conduct, disregard of workplace complaints, insensitivity to the impact of his spouse's presence in the workplace, and failure to enforce an agreement that his spouse should not work in the office."

After GitHub
Following his resignation from GitHub, Preston-Werner sold his shares in the company to Microsoft. Along with a team of former GitHub co-founders and executives, Preston-Werner then cofounded Chatterbug, a software for language-learning. In 2018, Chatterbug cofounder Scott Chacon announced an $8 million series A funding round for the company, financed by himself and Preston-Werner. Preston-Werner, a hacker himself, has hosted AMA-style events for student hackers, such as for Hack Club, at the Def Hacks Virtual 2020 hackathon, and Dubhacks 2020.

Personal life

Preston-Werner lives in San Francisco with his wife Theresa and their sons.

His wife is a former graduate student in cultural anthropology known for her involvement in historical research and social subjects.

See also
 Jekyll (software)

References

Living people
1979 births
People from Dubuque, Iowa
Businesspeople from Iowa
American technology chief executives
21st-century American businesspeople
GitHub people
American software engineers
American technology company founders
Businesspeople in software